Palacio de Deportes de la Comunidad de Madrid (English: Sports Palace of the Regional Community of Madrid), officially WiZink Center since November 2016 for sponsorship reasons, is an indoor sporting arena located in Madrid, Spain.

The former building, which was built in 1960, was destroyed by a fire in 2001. Architects Enrique Hermoso and Paloma Huidobro projected a High-Tech style new arena that was built at the same location between 2002 and 2005.

The arena hosted two major international basketball events in the first decade of the 21st century - the knockout stage of EuroBasket 2007 and the EuroLeague's Final Four 2008. It also hosted the final stage of the Copa del Rey of basketball in 2006, 2009, 2011, 2019 and 2021. The arena was the finals venue for the 2014 FIBA Basketball World Cup and the Euroleague Final Four 2015.

History

Origins (1874–1960) 

Until the late 19th century, the area where the Sports Centre was an area of orchards on the perimeter of the city, in Goya street below, the edge of the extension that had been done at the behest of Marques de Salamanca. In 1872 the then mayor of Madrid, the Count of Toreno, laid the foundation stone of a new bullring, since the old, located next to the Puerta de Alcalá, was demolished for the construction of new neighborhood. Two years later, on 4 September 1874 the mayor inaugurated the bullring, built in a neomudéjar style and designed by architects Álvarez Lorenzo Capra and Emilio Rodríguez Ayuso.

Due to increasing population of the city and the great love of bullfighting existing in Madrid, the bullring was deemed small and 1931  a new bullring was inaugurated, the Monumental de las Ventas next to the Abroñigal stream. For three years the new bullring was virtually unused and  bullfights were still held at Goya. The last was held on 14 October 1934. A week later, on 21 October, was formally inaugurated the Plaza de Las Ventas. La Plaza de Goya street history of the Palace of Sports was demolished a few days later.

The site remained empty for years given the state of penury in which the country found itself after the Civil War and the postwar years. Finally, 1952, Mayor José María Gutiérrez del Castillo promoted the construction of an indoor arena such as already exist in other European capitals. In 1953 a competition was held for the completion of the palace. In 1956, the National Sports Delegation, Opted for the project by architects José Soteras and Lorenzo García Barbon, authors Palacio de los Deportes de Barcelona opened a year ago to host the Mediterranean Games held in the city.

First venue (1960–2001) 

The project of the Sports Palace was a circular building 115 m in diameter, built of reinforced concrete and metal sheath. The work cost 56 million pesetas.

The original capacity was 10,000 to 16,000 depending on the configuration of grades and activities that develop inside. Thus, for example, to test the capacity cycling was 10,609 and 16,137 boxing bouts.

The palace was inaugurated in 1960. In 1969, it was expanded with basketball courts, cycling, hockey and athletics. In 1985, ownership of the Palace was transferred to the regional administration of the Community of Madrid, who undertook a comprehensive reform of the building.

During the 41-year life of this first Palacio de los Deportes gathered inside a number of sports competitions: basketball, athletics, boxing, handball, martial arts, cycling and gymnastics as well as equestrian, skating, hockey and up trial. Hosted the Real Madrid from 1986 until 1998 and Estudiantes form 1987 until the fire.

On 28 June 2001, the Sports Centre suffered a fire and was in ruins.

Rebuilt venue (2005–present) 

After the fire, the Comunidad de Madrid decided to build a new building in the same place. It was designed by architects Enrique Hermoso and Paloma Huidobro. Its construction was started 20 February 2002 with a budget of 124 million euros. He took advantage of the former building of the structure, particularly the facade of the Plaza de Salvador Dalí and Avenida de Felipe II and the back of the Calle Fuente del Berro. It was inaugurated 16 February 2005 by Mayor Alberto Ruiz-Gallardón and the president of the Community of Madrid Esperanza Aguirre.

It has a variable capacity depending on the configuration to be adopted:
Athletics: 10,000 (with 200m track and six lanes)
Handball: 14,000
Basketball: 15,000
Concerts: 15,500 (with standing public ramp)

Concerts hosted

1900s

2000s

2010s 

Note: Meghan Trainor's The Untouchable Tour is a part of the Coca-Cola Music Experience.

Attendance 
This is a list of home attendance figures of Estudiantes and Real Madrid for league, playoffs and EuroLeague games, the latter only for Real Madrid.

See also
 List of indoor arenas in Spain

References

External links 

 

2008 Final Four venue on Euroleague.net
2015 Final Four venue on Euroleague.net

Indoor arenas in Spain
Sports venues in Madrid
Badminton venues
Basketball venues in Spain
Indoor track and field venues
Sports venues completed in 1960
Sports venues completed in 2005
Taekwondo venues
Buildings and structures in Salamanca District, Madrid